Following is a list of all Article III United States federal judges appointed by President John Adams. In total, John Adams appointed 23 Article III United States federal judges during his tenure (1797–1801) as President of the United States. Of these, 3 were appointments to the Supreme Court of the United States, 16 were to the United States circuit courts, and 4 to the United States district courts. Fourteen of the sixteen circuit court judges appointed by Adams were to positions created at the end of his tenure in office, in the Judiciary Act of 1801, 2 Stat. 89, which became known as the Midnight Judges Act. All of these offices were abolished by the repeal of this Act on July 1, 1802, by 2 Stat. 132. The remaining two were to judgeships for the District of Columbia, authorized under a different Act of Congress, not the Judiciary Act.

Nonetheless, Adams made an indelible impact on the federal judiciary with the appointment of John Marshall as Chief Justice to succeed Oliver Ellsworth, who had retired due to ill health. Adams himself called this appointment "the proudest act of my life."

United States Supreme Court justices

Also appointed, but declined: John Jay (Chief Justice).

Circuit courts

Also appointed, but declined: Thomas Bee (5th circuit), Joseph Clay Jr. (5th circuit), Jared Ingersoll (3rd circuit), Thomas Johnson (D.C. circuit), Charles Lee (4th circuit), and John Sitgreaves (5th circuit).

District courts

See also
Marbury v. Madison (1803)
Stuart v. Laird (1803)
United States v. More (1805)

Notes

References

Sources
 Federal Judicial Center

Judicial appointments
Adams, John